is a passenger railway station in the city of Midori, Gunma Prefecture, Japan, operated by East Japan Railway Company (JR East).

Lines
Iwajuku Station is a station on the Ryōmō Line, and is located 56.9 rail kilometers from the terminus of the line at Oyama Station.

Station layout
The station has one side platform and one island platform connected by a footbridge. The station is staffed.

Platforms

History
It was renamed to its present name on 1 May 1911. The current station building was completed in March 1936. The station was absorbed into the JR East network upon the privatization of the Japanese National Railways (JNR) on 1 April 1987.

Passenger statistics
In fiscal 2019, the station was used by an average of 1255 passengers daily (boarding passengers only).

Surrounding area
Iwajuku archaeological site and museum
Kiryu University

See also
 List of railway stations in Japan

References

External links

 JR East Station information 

Railway stations in Gunma Prefecture
Ryōmō Line
Stations of East Japan Railway Company
Railway stations in Japan opened in 1889
Midori, Gunma